Bhogpur Kenaram Memorial High School is a Bengali medium Higher Secondary for both boys and girls is situated in Bhogpur, Purba Medinipur district, West Bengal, India. The school is not far from the Bhogpur railway station. Most of the students are from nearby, especially from the Bhogpur. The school was established in 1946 and currently has approximately about 2400 students and 60 staff members. It offers arts, science, and vocational courses.

References

High schools and secondary schools in West Bengal
Schools in Purba Medinipur district
Educational institutions established in 1946
1946 establishments in India